Vania Arianti Sukoco (born 28 August 1999) is an Indonesian badminton player. She is a member of the PB Djarum, and has joined the club in 2011. She won her first international senior title at the 2016 Vietnam International Series tournament in the mixed doubles event partnered with Rinov Rivaldy. In 2017, she clinched the women's doubles title at the national championships in Pangkal Pinang partnered with Tania Oktaviani Kusumah.

Achievements

BWF International Challenge/Series 
Women's doubles

Mixed doubles

  BWF International Challenge tournament
  BWF International Series tournament

Performance timeline

Indonesian team 
 Junior level

Individual competitions 
 Junior level

 Senior level

References

External links 
 

1999 births
Living people
People from Surakarta
Sportspeople from Central Java
Indonesian female badminton players
20th-century Indonesian women
21st-century Indonesian women